The helicopter hieroglyphs is a name given to part of an Egyptian hieroglyph carving from the Temple of Seti I at Abydos. In paleocontact hypothesis circles the hieroglyphs have been interpreted as an out-of-place artifact depicting a helicopter (above the nine short vertical bars) as well as other examples of modern technology.

The "helicopter" image is the result of carved stone being re-used over time.  The initial carving was made during the reign of Seti I and translates to "He who repulses the nine [enemies of Egypt]".  This carving was later filled in with plaster and re-carved during the reign of Ramesses II with the title "He who protects Egypt and overthrows the foreign countries".  Over time, the plaster has eroded away, leaving both inscriptions partially visible and creating a palimpsest-like effect of overlapping hieroglyphs. As with all dates in Ancient Egypt, the actual dates of Seti's reign are unclear, and various historians propose different dates, with 1294 BC to 1279 BC and 1290 BC to 1279 BC being the most commonly used by scholars today.

See also
Dendera light

References

External links 
 Temples of Abydos 360-degree view
Page showing how two different sets of hieroglyphs could have merged into the controversial images.

13th-century BC works
Abydos, Egypt
Ancient astronaut speculation
Egyptian hieroglyphs
Forteana
Pseudoarchaeology
Seti I